Eutretini is a tribe of tephritid  or fruit flies in the family Tephritidae.

Genera
Afreutreta Bezzi, 1924
Cosmetothrix Loew, 1869
Cryptotreta Blanc & Foote, 1961
Dictyotrypeta Hendel, 1914
Dracontomyia Becker, 1919
Eutreta Loew, 1873
Merzomyia Korneyev, 1996
Paracantha Coquillett, 1899
Polymorphomyia Snow, 1894
Pseudeutreta Hendel, 1914
Rachiptera Bigot, 1859
Stenopa Loew, 1873
Tarchonanthea Freidberg & Kaplan, 1993
Xanthomyia Phillips, 1923

References

Tephritinae
Brachycera tribes